Emblanda emblematica is a species of sea snail, a marine aquatic operculate gastropod mollusks in the clade Littorinimorpha.

Emblanda emblematica is the sole species in the genus Emblanda, which itself is the only genus within the family Emblandidae.

Distribution 
This species occurs in southeastern Australia.

References

External links 

Emblandidae
Gastropods described in 1906
Taxa named by Winston Ponder